The 1952 Boston Braves season was the 82nd season of the franchise; the team went  and was seventh in the eight-team National League, 32 games behind the pennant-winning Brooklyn Dodgers. Home attendance for the season at Braves Field was under 282,000.

This was the final season for the franchise in Boston, Massachusetts, and the last home game at Braves Field was played on September 21. Several weeks prior to the 1953 season, the team moved to Milwaukee, Wisconsin, which was the first franchise relocation in the majors in a half century. By , four other teams had moved. The Braves stayed for thirteen years in Milwaukee, and then went to Atlanta prior to the 1966 season.

Regular season

Season standings

Record vs. opponents

Roster

Player stats

Batting

Starters by position 
Note: Pos = Position; G = Games played; AB = At bats; H = Hits; Avg. = Batting average; HR = Home runs; RBI = Runs batted in

Other batters 
Note: G = Games played; AB = At bats; H = Hits; Avg. = Batting average; HR = Home runs; RBI = Runs batted in

Pitching

Starting pitchers 
Note: G = Games pitched; IP = Innings pitched; W = Wins; L = Losses; ERA = Earned run average; SO = Strikeouts

Other pitchers 
Note: G = Games pitched; IP = Innings pitched; W = Wins; L = Losses; ERA = Earned run average; SO = Strikeouts

Relief pitchers 
Note: G = Games pitched; W = Wins; L = Losses; SV = Saves; ERA = Earned run average; SO = Strikeouts

Farm system 

LEAGUE CHAMPIONS: Hagerstown, Quebec, Harlan

References

External links
1952 Boston Braves season at Baseball Reference

Boston Braves seasons
Boston Braves
Boston Braves
1950s in Boston